Pishan railway station is a railway station in Pishan County along the Kashgar–Hotan railway. It was opened on 20 June 2011. It is operated by China Railway Ürümqi Group.

Around the station
 Pishan Vocational and Technical School
 Pishan Senior High School
 Pishan Environmental Protection Bureau
 Pishan Housing Bureau
 Pishan No. 3 Middle School
 Pishan No. 4 Elementary School
 Pishan Public Security Bureau
 Pishan Sanxia Industrial Park

History
The station was built in 2010.

References

External links
 中国铁路客户服务中心 

Railway stations in Xinjiang
Hotan Prefecture
Railway stations in China opened in 2011
Stations on the Kashgar–Hotan Railway